Nebljusi is a village in Croatia. It is connected by the D218 highway.

Population

According to the 2011 census, Nebljusi had 208 inhabitants.

Note: From 1857-1880 include data for the settlement of Gornji Štrbci, in 1890 part of data for that settlement, and from 1857-1880 part of data for the settlement of Kruge. In 1931 include data for the settlements of Donji Štrbci and Kestenovac. It also include data for the formerly independent settlement of Seoce.

1991 census

According to the 1991 census, settlement of Nebljusi had 303 inhabitants, which were ethnically declared as this:

Austro-hungarian 1910 census

According to the 1910 census, settlement of Nebljusi had 1,165 inhabitants in 4 hamlets, which were linguistically and religiously declared as this:

Note: In 1910 census hamlet of Seoce was in Bosnia and Herzegovina.

Literature 

  Savezni zavod za statistiku i evidenciju FNRJ i SFRJ, popis stanovništva 1948, 1953, 1961, 1971, 1981. i 1991. godine.
 Knjiga: "Narodnosni i vjerski sastav stanovništva Hrvatske, 1880-1991: po naseljima, autor: Jakov Gelo, izdavač: Državni zavod za statistiku Republike Hrvatske, 1998., ;

References

Populated places in Lika-Senj County